Érica Anabella Farías (born 13 July 1984), known as "La Pantera", is an Argentine professional boxer. She is a two-weight world champion, having held the WBC female lightweight title from 2011 to 2014 and the WBC female super lightweight title from 2014 to 2018. She also challenged once for the undisputed welterweight championship in 2017. As an amateur, she won a silver medal at the 2006 World Championships. As of October 2020, she is ranked as the world's second best active female super lightweight by BoxRec and fourth by The Ring.

Amateur career
Farias made her competitive debut as an amateur on 10 December 2005, against Carolina Lopez. She won a gold medal at the 2006 Pan American Championships in Buenos Aires, Argentina, and silver at the 2006 World Championships in New Delhi, India, losing to Katie Taylor of Ireland in the final, both in the lightweight division.

Professional career
Farias made her professional debut on 25 July 2009, at Estadio F.A.B. in Buenos Aires. She won a four-round unanimous decision over Betiana Patricia Viñas. Farias won her fight against Ann Saccurato in 2011, after it was stopped in the eighth round due to an accidental clash of heads.

On 4 April 2014, Farias made the tenth defense of her WBC lightweight title against Delfine Persoon. She lost in a ten-round unanimous decision.

Farias won her second world title, WBC super lightweight, on 15 November 2014, defeating Alejandra Oliveras by split decision. On 2 May 2015, she made the first defense of her title against Klara Svensson. She won by unanimous decision.

On 9 June 2017, Farias challenged undisputed welterweight champion Cecilia Brækhus, but lost by unanimous decision.

Professional boxing record

References

External links

1984 births
Living people
Boxers from Buenos Aires
Argentine women boxers
World Boxing Council champions
World lightweight boxing champions
World light-welterweight boxing champions